Currently, ESPN Radio 1000 airs the Chicago Bears football games with Jeff Joniak doing the play-by-play, along with color commentator Tom Thayer and sideline reporter Mark Grote. Over the years, many Bears play-by-play broadcasters have included Jack Brickhouse and Wayne Larrivee. Their current preseason TV announcers on Fox Chicago are Adam Amin or Kyle Brandt (play-by-play), Jim Miller (color commentary) and Lou Canellis (sideline reporter).

Radio announcers

Bears Radio Network
The Bears Radio Network stretches 16 stations over three states as of the 2021 season.

References

 
Chicago Bears
Broadcasters